Alberto "Beto" Espínola Giménez (born 8 February 1991) is a Paraguayan professional footballer who plays as a rightback for Cerro Porteño and the Paraguay national team.

Playing career
Espínola made his professional debut with Rubio Ñu in a 2–1 Paraguayan Primera División win over Guaraní on 11 February 2012. On 15 January 2019, Espínola signed with Cerro Porteño after a long stint with General Díaz.

International career
Espínola debuted for the Paraguay national team in a 2–2 2022 World Cup qualification win over Peru, assisting both his team's goals in his debut.

References

External links

1991 births
Living people
People from Caazapá
Paraguayan footballers
Paraguay international footballers
Association football fullbacks
Club Rubio Ñu footballers
Club Sol de América footballers
Cerro Porteño players
Paraguayan Primera División players